Donald Narcisse (born February 26, 1965) is a former wide receiver for the Saskatchewan Roughriders in the Canadian Football League. He played college football at Texas Southern University. He signed with Saskatchewan as a free agent on September 1, 1987.

As a result of rarely being injured and giving strong on-field performances, Narcisse shared and held a few records. He had over 1,000 receiving yards for seven consecutive seasons from 1989 to 1995 including a career-high 1419 yards in 1989. Despite this consistency, the Roughriders were frequently an average team in the middle or bottom half of the standings. He played alongside Ray Elgaard and Jeff Fairholm, who combined to be a top group of receivers, among the best in the league.

At the time of his retirement, he was first all-time in career receptions, third in career receiving yards and tied for first with eight seasons with more than 1000 yards. Narcisse holds the professional football record for most consecutive games with at least one reception in every game (216). He is considered one of the greatest players in Roughriders history and one of the league's greatest receivers.

Narcisse was a popular and respected man due to his positive and warm nature towards fans, players and media. His community involvement became much appreciated throughout his career. His most well-known contribution was the "Catch For Kids" program with SaskEnergy on behalf of Kidsport Saskatchewan which began in 1998. The program has evolved to include a charity Saskatchewan Roughrider player calendar, as well as charity bowling event which today raises more than $100,000 annually for Kidsport.  That same season, the Leader Post newspaper ranked him as No. 7 on their list of 50 greatest Roughrider players. He won a Grey Cup with the Riders in 1989 and reached the finals again in 1997. After spending his entire career with the Roughriders, Narcisse retired at the conclusion of the 1999 season.

In 2000, Narcisse coached for the San Antonio Matadors of the Spring Football League.

In 2003, Narcisse was voted into the Saskatchewan Roughriders Plaza of Honour.  Three years later in 2006, Narcisse was among 185 players nominated for The TSN/CFL 50 Greatest Players list. He was not voted into the top 50. He was among the 135 players Honour Roll of those who didn't make the list. He was inducted into the Canadian Football Hall of Fame in 2010.

CFL
13 seasons: 1987–1999

Regular-season stats

 216 games, 919 receptions, 75 touchdowns, 12,366 yards
 8 – more than 1,000 yard seasons, 2 – more than 900 yards seasons
 34 – more than 100 yard games 
 Led CFL in receptions (123) – 1995

Playoffs stats

 Grey Cup: 2 games, 12 receptions, 158 yards, 1 TD
 Overall: 9 games, 41 receptions, 560 yards, 2 TD

Awards & Honors

 Grey Cups – won > 1989, lost > 1997
 CFL All-Star: 1989, 1990, 1995, 1998 
 Division All-Star: 1989, 1990, 1993, 1995, 1998
 Roughriders nominee for Most Outstanding CFL Player in 1995
 Molson Cup – Roughriders Most Popular Player – 1994, 1995, 1998

Records

 1st – (11) – Most seasons with pass reception in all games 
 1st – (216) – Most consecutive games with pass receptions, regular season 
 2nd – (216) – Most games with pass receptions, regular season
 Tied 2nd – (15) Most pass receptions in a regular-season game
 3rd – (123) Most pass receptions in a regular season
 3rd – (7) – Most consecutive more than 1,000 pass receiving yard seasons
 4th – (919) – Most pass receptions, all-time regular season

U.S. college
In senior season at Texas Southern > 88 receptions, 1,074 yards 
1986 NCAA Division I-AA receiving crown 
Named First-Team NCAA Division I All-American, All-Southwest Conference

External links
 DonNarcisse.com Official Website
 @donnarcisse on Twitter

1965 births
Living people
American football wide receivers
American players of Canadian football
Canadian Football Hall of Fame inductees
Canadian football wide receivers
Saskatchewan Roughriders players
Sportspeople from Port Arthur, Texas
Texas Southern Tigers football players